The 13th Saturn Awards, honoring the best in science fiction, fantasy and horror film in 1985, were held on May 28, 1986.

Winners and nominees
Below is a complete list of nominees and winners. Winners are highlighted in bold.

Film awards

Special awards

George Pal Memorial Award
 Charles Band

Life Career Award
 Vincent Price

President's Award
 Woody Allen – The Purple Rose of Cairo

References

External links
 The Official Saturn Awards Site

Saturn
Saturn Awards ceremonies
Saturn